Keegan James Taylor (27 September 1984 – 27 December 2013) was a Zimbabwean cricketer. A right-handed batsman and right-arm off break bowler, he played three first-class matches for his home province Manicaland during the 2001–02 Logan Cup.

Following a short illness, Taylor died of heart failure on 27 December 2013 in Harare, aged 29.

References

External links
 

1984 births
2013 deaths
Zimbabwean cricketers
Manicaland cricketers
Cricketers from Mutare